Heather Beers is an American actress and freelance writer. Her two most notable movie roles have been as the title character in Charly (a 2002 independent film based on the 1980 Jack Weyland novel of the same title) and as Charity (the lead female role) in Baptists at Our Barbecue.

Life and career
Beers grew up in southern California, where she attended Los Amigos High School.  Her mother was the director of a community theatre, and Beers took lead roles in many of the theatre's productions.  Beers received a degree in English from the University of Utah and then worked for many years in a Salt Lake City-based advertising company, while still continuing with her acting career.

Beers has contributed articles to the following magazines:  Entrée Magazine, Salt Lake Magazine, Utah Bride, and Utah Style & Design.

In addition to her acting, she contributed her voice to the 2005 video game Amped 3, as well as for Maverik, McCune Mansion, RC Willey, Saturday Night Live, The WB, and the Utah Transit Authority.

Not only was she the lead actress in the movie Charly, she also contributed her professional skills as one of the publicists for the movie.

Beers is also married with children.

Filmography

Film

Television

Sources
filmbug.com

References 

American film actresses
Latter Day Saints from California
Living people
University of Utah alumni
21st-century American actresses
American voice actresses
Actresses from California
American television actresses
Latter Day Saints from Utah
Year of birth missing (living people)